Hobbs Cross may refer to the following places in the Epping Forest district of Essex, England:

 Hobbs Cross, Matching
 Hobbs Cross, Theydon Garnon